Antonio Elio or Antonio Helius (1506–1576) was a Roman Catholic prelate who served as Bishop of Capodistria (1572–1576), Titular Patriarch of Jerusalem (1558–1572), and Bishop of Pula (1548–1566).

Biography
Antonio Elio was born in Capodistria in 1506.
On 17 August 1548, he was appointed during the papacy of Pope Paul III as Bishop of Pula.
On 20 July 1558, he was appointed during the papacy of Pope Paul IV as Titular Patriarch of Jerusalem.
In 1566, he resigned as Bishop of Pula.
On 30 July 1572, he was appointed during the papacy of Pope Gregory XIII as Bishop of Capodistria.
He served as Bishop of Capodistria until his death in 1576.

Episcopal succession
While bishop, he was the principal consecrator of:
Giuseppe Pamphilj, Bishop of Segni (1570);

and the principal co-consecrator of:

References

External links and additional sources
 (for Chronology of Bishops) 
 (for Chronology of Bishops) 
 (for Chronology of Bishops) 
 (for Chronology of Bishops) 
 (for Chronology of Bishops) 
 (for Chronology of Bishops) 

16th-century Roman Catholic bishops in the Holy Roman Empire
Bishops appointed by Pope Paul III
Bishops appointed by Pope Paul IV
Bishops appointed by Pope Gregory XIII
1506 births
1576 deaths
16th-century Roman Catholic bishops in Croatia